For a plane curve C and a given fixed point O, the pedal equation of the curve is a relation between r and p where r is the distance from O to a point on C and p is the perpendicular distance from O to the tangent line to C at the point. The point O is called the pedal point and the values r and p are sometimes called the pedal coordinates of a point relative to the curve and the pedal point.

Some curves have particularly simple pedal equations and knowing the pedal equation of a curve may simplify the calculation of certain of its properties such as curvature. These coordinates are also well suited for solving certain type of force problems in classical mechanics and celestial mechanics.

Equations

Cartesian coordinates
For C given in rectangular coordinates by f(x, y) = 0, and with O taken to be the origin, the pedal coordinates of the point (x, y) are given by:

The pedal equation can be found by eliminating x and y from these equations and the equation of the curve.

The expression for p may be simplified if the equation of the curve is written in homogeneous coordinates by introducing a variable z, so that the equation of the curve is g(x, y, z) = 0. The value of p is then given by

where the result is evaluated at z=1

Polar coordinates
For C given in polar coordinates by r = f(θ), then

where  is the polar tangential angle given by

The pedal equation can be found by eliminating θ from these equations.

Alternatively, from the above we can find that

where  is the "contrapedal" coordinate, i.e. distance to the normal. This implies that if a curve satisfies an autonomous differential equation in polar coordinates of the form:

its pedal equation becomes

Example
As an example take the logarithmic spiral with the spiral angle α:

Differentiating with respect to  we obtain

hence 

and thus in pedal coordinates we get

or using the fact that  we obtain

This approach can be generalized to include autonomous differential equations of any order as follows: A curve C which a solution of an n-th order autonomous differential equation in polar coordinates

is the pedal curve of a curve given in pedal coordinates by

Force problems
Solutions to some force problems of classical mechanics can be surprisingly easily obtained in pedal coordinates.

Consider a dynamical system:

describing an evolution of a test particle (with position  and velocity ) in the plane in the presence of central  and Lorentz like  potential. The quantities:

are conserved in this system.

with the pedal point at the origin. This fact was discovered by P. Blaschke in 2017.

Example
As an example consider the so-called Kepler problem, i.e. central force problem, where the force varies inversely as a square of the distance:

we can arrive at the solution immediately in pedal coordinates

,

Thus we have obtained the equation of a conic section in pedal coordinates.

Inversely, for a given curve C, we can easily deduce what forces do we have to impose on a test particle to move along it.

Pedal equations for specific curves

Sinusoidal spirals
For a sinusoidal spiral written in the form 

the polar tangential angle is 

which produces the pedal equation

The pedal equation for a number of familiar curves can be obtained setting n to specific values:

Spirals
A spiral shaped curve of the form

satisfies the equation

and thus can be easily converted into pedal coordinates as 

Special cases include:

Epi- and hypocycloids
For an epi- or hypocycloid given by parametric equations

the pedal equation with respect to the origin is

or

with

Special cases obtained by setting b= for specific values of n include:

Other curves
Other pedal equations are:,

See also
Pedal curve

References

External links

Coordinate systems